Karpovka is a rural locality (a selo) and the administrative center of Karpovskoye Rural Settlement, Gorodishchensky District, Volgograd Oblast, Russia. The population was 1,591 as of 2010. There are 15 streets.

Geography 
Karpovka is located in steppe, on the Karpovka River, 53 km southwest of Gorodishche (the district's administrative centre) by road. Prudboy is the nearest rural locality.

References 

Rural localities in Gorodishchensky District, Volgograd Oblast
Don Host Oblast